Ilytheinae is a subfamily of shore flies in the family Ephydridae.

Genera
Tribe Ilytheini Cresson, 1943
Donaceus Cresson, 1943
Ilythea Haliday, 1837
Zeros Cresson, 1943
Tribe Hyadinini Phillips et al. in Cresson, 1949
Axysta Haliday, 1839
 Garifuna Mathis, 1997
Hyadina Haliday, 1837
Nostima Coquillett, 1900
Parahyadina Tonnoir & Malloch, 1926
 Parydroptera Collin, 1913
 Pelina Haliday, 1837
 Pelinoides Cresson, 1931
 Philygria Stenhammar, 1844

References

Ephydridae
Brachycera subfamilies
Taxa named by Ezra Townsend Cresson